72 Batmanspor, formerly Batman Belediyespor, is a Turkish sports club based in Batman. The football club plays in the Turkish Amateur League.

External links 
72 Batmanspor on TFF.org

 
Association football clubs established in 1986
Sport in Batman, Turkey
Football clubs in Turkey
1986 establishments in Turkey